The 155th Reserve Panzer Division (German 155. Reserve-Panzer-Division) was formed by redesignation of Panzer-Division Nr.155 in August 1943.  The division was stationed in France from August 1943 to April 1944 when it was absorbed by 9th Panzer Division.

Commanders 
Generalleutnant Franz Landgraf (1 Aug 1943-23 Aug 1943) 
Generalmajor Curt von Jesser    (24 Aug 1943-6 Sep 1943) 
Generalleutnant Franz Landgraf (7 Sep 1943-30 Sep 1943)
Generaleutnant Max Fremerey    (1 Oct 1943-30 Apr 1944)

Area of operations 
France (August 1943 - April 1944)

Order of battle 
Reserve Panzer Abteilung 7 
Reserve Panzergrandier Regiment 5
Reserve Grenadier Regiment (mot) 25
Reserve Artellerie Abteilung (mot) 260
Reserve Aufklarungs Abteilung (mot) 9
Reserve Panzerjager Abteilung 5
Reserve Panzer Nachrichten Kompanie 1055
Reserve Panzer Versorgungstruppen

References 
Geschichte der niedersächsischen 19. Panzer-Division 1939 - 1945 - Otto von Knobelsdorff
 
 

1*19
Military units and formations established in 1942
Military units and formations disestablished in 1944